The 1956 Kentucky Derby was the 82nd running of the Kentucky Derby. The race took place on May 5, 1956.

Full results

Winning Breeder: William E. Leach; (FL)

References

1956
Kentucky Derby
Derby
Kentucky
Kentucky Derby